David Challinor (1920–2008) was an American biologist, naturalist, and science advisor.

References

2008 deaths
American naturalists
1920 births
Harvard University alumni
20th-century naturalists